NFL Country is a compilation album released by the National Football League that featured country musicians performing songs with NFL stars. The album made it to 66 on the Top Country Albums and was released the same day as NFL Jams, an album with a similar concept but with hip hop music instead.

Among the tracks, "Let Somebody Else Drive" is a re-recording of John Anderson's 1984 single. "You Never Know Just How Good You've Got It", performed here by Glen Campbell, also appeared on Tracy Byrd's 1994 album No Ordinary Man, and "Four Scores and Seven Beers Ago" was previously a single for Ray Benson in 1991.

Stephen Thomas Erlewine of AllMusic says "It's not much more than a novelty item, but as a novelty item, it's pretty entertaining, since the music itself is fairly strong and the athletes do provide a few chuckles."

Track listing

Chart performance

References

Sports compilation albums
1996 compilation albums
Country music compilation albums
National Football League music